There have been five baronetcies created for persons with the surname of White, one in the Baronetage of Great Britain and four in the Baronetage of the United Kingdom.  The baronets include Blagdon in the County of Northumberland, Tuxford and Wallingwells in the County of Nottingham, Cotham House in Bristol, Salle Park in the County of Norfolk, and Boulge Hall in the County of Suffolk.

White (later Ridley) baronets, of Blagdon (1756)
The White baronetcy, of Blagdon in the County of Northumberland, was created in the Baronetage of Great Britain in 1756 for Matthew White, with remainder to the heirs male of his sister Elizabeth, wife of Matthew Ridley. Sir Matthew White Ridley, 5th Baronet, was created Viscount Ridley in 1900.

White baronets, of Tuxford and Wallingwells (1802)

The White baronetcy, of Tuxford and Wallingwells in the County of Nottingham, was created in the Baronetage of the United Kingdom on 20 December 1802 for Thomas Woollaston White, with remainder to the heirs male of his father.
Sir Thomas Woollaston White, 1st Baronet (1767–1817)
Sir Thomas Woollaston White, 2nd Baronet (1801–1882)
Sir Thomas Woollaston White, 3rd Baronet (1828–1907)
Sir Archibald Woollaston White, 4th Baronet (1877–1945)
Sir Thomas Astley Woollaston White, 5th Baronet (1904–1996)
Sir Nicholas Peter Archibald White, 6th Baronet (born 1939)

The heir apparent to the baronetcy is Christopher David Nicholas White (born 1972), eldest son of the 6th Baronet.

White baronets, of Cotham House (1904)

The White baronetcy, of Cotham House in the City and County of Bristol, was created in the Baronetage of the United Kingdom on 26 August 1904 for George White, owner of Bristol Tramways and Carriage Company and the founder of the Bristol Aeroplane Company.
Sir George White, 1st Baronet (1854–1916)
Sir George Stanley White, 2nd Baronet (1882–1964)
Sir George Stanley Midelton White, 3rd Baronet (1913–1983)
Sir George Stanley James White, 4th Baronet (born 1948)

His heir apparent is (George) Philip James White (born 1987)

White baronets, of Salle Park (1922)

The White baronetcy, of Salle Park in the County of Norfolk, was created in the Baronetage of the United Kingdom on 29 June 1922 for Woolmer White. The second Baronet represented Fareham in the House of Commons.
Sir Woolmer Rudolph Donati White, 1st Baronet (1858–1931)
Sir (Rudolph) Dymoke White, 2nd Baronet (1888–1968)
Sir Headley Dymoke White, 3rd Baronet (1914–1971)
Sir John Woolmer White, 4th Baronet (born 1947)

The heir apparent to the baronetcy is Kyle Dymoke Wilfrid White (born 1988), only son of the 4th Baronet.

White baronets, of Boulge Hall (1937)

The White baronetcy, of Boulge Hall in the County of Suffolk, was created in the Baronetage of the United Kingdom on 14 June 1937 for Robert Eaton White, Chairman of the Suffolk County Council. The baronetcy became extinct on the death in 2015 of the third Baronet, who did not claim the title.
Sir Robert Eaton White, 1st Baronet (1864–1940)
Sir (Eric) Richard Meadows White, 2nd Baronet (1910–1972)
Sir Christopher Robert Meadows White, 3rd Baronet (1940–2015)

References

Sources
Kidd, Charles, Williamson, David (editors). Debrett's Peerage and Baronetage (1990 edition). New York: St Martin's Press, 1990.

External links
 Succession list

Baronetcies in the Baronetage of Great Britain
Baronetcies in the Baronetage of the United Kingdom
Extinct baronetcies in the Baronetage of the United Kingdom
Baronetcies created with special remainders